The Les Onglous Lighthouse is the terminating point of the Canal du Midi where the canal enters the Étang de Thau. The red and white lighthouse is at the tip of a short jetty projecting into the Étang de Thau.
The Isthmus of Onglous is a narrow strip of land between the Étang and the Mediterranean.

Gallery

See also 

 List of lighthouses in France

References

External links 
 

Canal du Midi
Lighthouses in France